Robert Maćkowiak (born 13 May 1970 in Rawicz, Wielkopolskie) is a former Polish sprinter. Together with Tomasz Czubak, Jacek Bocian and Piotr Haczek he won the gold medal in 4 x 400 metres relay at the 1999 World Championships in Athletics. Maćkowiak has also won other relay medals as well as individual medals in the 200 metres and 400 metres.

He belonged to the most famous and successful Polish relay team in the 1990s together with Tomasz Czubak, Piotr Haczek and Piotr Rysiukiewicz. Numerous injuries prevented them from joining the best relays of all time. The worst disaster happened in the Olympic Games in Sydney. The Polish team was one of the favourites to win a medal (after unstoppable U.S. really there were two main rivals: Jamaica and Bahamas). On the second leg (on the first ran Rysiukiewicz) Maćkowiak was leading, but he ran into a starting box (Polish team ran on the eighth lane) and Poland lost their medal chances. The relay finished seventh in the competition. Maćkowiak also competed in the individual race in which he finished fifth.

Maćkowiak was also one of the favourites in the World Championships in Edmonton 2001). His main rival was German runner Ingo Schultz who had best times in qualification runs. Maćkowiak was a candidate for silver but he got an injury a few days before final and he lost all medal chances. He also didn't start in the relay run which took place a few days after individual start.

He officially retired at the end of the 2006 season.

Competition record

Personal bests
Outdoor
200 metres - 20.61 s (1996)
400 metres - 44.84 s (2001)

Indoor
200 metres - 20.68 s (2002)
400 metres - 45.94 s (1997)

See also
Polish records in athletics

Notes

References

1970 births
Living people
Polish male sprinters
Athletes (track and field) at the 1996 Summer Olympics
Athletes (track and field) at the 2000 Summer Olympics
Olympic athletes of Poland
World Athletics Championships medalists
People from Rawicz
European Athletics Championships medalists
Sportspeople from Greater Poland Voivodeship
Goodwill Games medalists in athletics
Śląsk Wrocław athletes
World Athletics Indoor Championships winners
World Athletics Indoor Championships medalists
World Athletics Championships winners
Competitors at the 1998 Goodwill Games